Patrick Murphy is a British artist, designer and curator. Murphy works across disciplines creating art, installations, events, exhibitions, branding and objects.

Biography
Murphy's work is exhibited internationally and held in public and private collections. His work has appeared in Creative Review, It's Nice That, Dezeen, The Guardian, BBC Radio 4, Monocle - Section D, and The Telegraph.

He is the founder and director of MADE NORTH and Sheffield Design Week and the founder of Modernist Guides. In 2015, he curated the British Road Sign Project, celebrating the road signs designed by Jock Kinneir and Margaret Calvert in 1965. Murphy invited more than 50 leading artists and designers to create their own signs which were displayed at the Design Museum and along the Thames.

He works across a wide range of projects from art commissions for large scale installations such as "Belonging" at Walker Gallery for Liverpool Biennial, "In pursuit of Happiness" at the Kunstenfestival in Watou, Belgium, "Flock" installation in Soho Square and the House of St Barnabas, London, "Strata", a large scale building art intervention, to curating leading design exhibitions and projects for others including curating the MADE NORTH Gallery programme and annual conference. Major projects have included "Revolutions from Gatefold to Download", a history of the album cover to the celebration of the 50th Anniversary of the British Road Sign Project in 2016. at the Design Museum, London.

References

External links
 Official website
 Sheffield Design Week
 MADE NORTH
 Modernist
 British Road Sign Project

Year of birth missing (living people)
Place of birth missing (living people)
English graphic designers
Living people